Sedimenticola thiotaurini is a sulfur-oxidizing and facultative anaerobe bacterium from the genus of Sedimenticola which has been isolated from salt marsh sediments from the Sippewissett Salt Marsh in the United States.

References

Alteromonadales
Bacteria described in 2015